Released in 1980, Stovies is the eighteenth album by The Corries. Recorded at one or more live concerts, most of the songs have spoken introductions. As well as two Jacobite folk songs written by the band, the release includes a tribute to Rob Roy.

Personnel
Roy Williamson (vocals), Ronnie Browne (vocals). They play guitars, pipes, harmonicas, whistles, flutes, concertina, mandolins,  (i.e. bodhrans), fiddle and combolins.

Track listing
 The Bloody Sarks (Ronnie Browne/Scobie)
 The Bonnie Moorhen (Traditional)
 Birnie Boozle (Traditional)
 Country Western Medley (Roy Williamson)
 The Broom O' The Cowdenknowes (Traditional)
 The Bantam Cock (Jake Thackray)
 Dumbarton's Drums (Traditional)
 The Standard On The Braes O' Mar (Traditional)
 Lucille (Bowling/Bynum)
 Arkinholm (Weir/Williamson)
 The Blackbird (Traditional)
 The Bricklayer's Song (Cooksey)
 Welcome Royal Charlie (Roy Williamson)

"Lucille" and "Country Western Medley" are parody of country music songs.

References

The Corries albums
1980 live albums